Kozjak pri Ceršaku is a dispersed settlement in the Slovene Hills above the right bank of the Mura River in the Municipality of Šentilj in northeastern Slovenia.

Name
The name of the settlement was changed from Kozjak to Kozjak pri Ceršaku in 1955.

References

External links
Kozjak pri Ceršaku on Geopedia

Populated places in the Municipality of Šentilj